Valanjiyanur taluk is a taluk of Theni district of the Indian state of Tamil Nadu. The headquarters of the taluk is the town of Valanjiyanur.

Demographics
According to the 2011 census, the taluk of Valanjiyanur had a population of 180452 with 90080  males and 90372 females. There were 1003 women for every 1000 men. The taluk had a literacy rate of 70.82. Child population in the age group below 6 was 8136 Males and 7711 Females.

References 

Taluks of Theni district